École Notre-Dame les Oiseaux is a Catholic private school in Verneuil sur Seine, France. It serves levels primaire (primary) through lycée (senior high school/sixth form college).

Notre-Dame International High School is the international school on the same property.

References

External links
 École Notre-Dame les Oiseaux 

Lycées in Yvelines
Private schools in France
Secondary schools in France
Schools in Yvelines
Catholic elementary and primary schools in France
Catholic secondary schools in France